Inspire is the thirty-third single released by Ayumi Hamasaki. It came out on July 28, 2004. The single was the number-one single on the Oricon charts for that week. To date, Inspire has sold over 330,000 copies, making it Hamasaki's highest selling single of 2004. The PV for Inspire was filmed in Los Angeles, California.

Track listing
 "Inspire" – 4:33
 "Game" – 4:16
 "Inspire" (instrumental) – 4:33
 "Game" (instrumental) – 4:16

DVD
 "Inspire" (PV)
 "Game" (PV)

Live performances
July 22, 2004 – AX Music – "INSPIRE"
July 23, 2004 – PopJam – "GAME"
July 23, 2004 – Music Station – "INSPIRE" and "GAME"
July 24, 2004 – CDTV – "INSPIRE"
July 27, 2004 – CDTV Special – "GAME"
August 2, 2004 – Hey! Hey! Hey! – "INSPIRE"
August 11, 2004 – Sokuhou Uta no Daijiten – "INSPIRE"
December 31, 2004 – CDTV Special 2004-2005 – "INSPIRE" and "GAME"
December 31, 2013 – Kouhaku Uta Gassen

Charts
Oricon Sales Chart (Japan)

  Total Sales :  390,000 (Japan)
  Total Sales :  420,000 (Avex)
 RIAJ certification: Platinum

References

External links
 "Inspire" information at Avex Network.
 "Inspire" CD+DVD information at Avex Network.
 "Inspire" information at Oricon.

Ayumi Hamasaki songs
2004 singles
Oricon Weekly number-one singles
Songs written by Ayumi Hamasaki
2004 songs
Avex Trax singles